Connor Maguire may refer to:
 Connor Maguire, 2nd Baron of Enniskillen, Irish nobleman
 Connor Roe Maguire (died 1625), Irish Gaelic chief of Magherastephana, County Fermanagh

See also
 Conor Maguire (judge), Irish politician, lawyer and judge
 Conor Maguire (rugby union), Irish rugby union player